Michelle Sévin (born 29 October 1955) is a retired French para table tennis player. She was awarded the Legion of Honor and Order of Merit for her services to youth and sport and voluntary work.

References

1955 births
Living people
Sportspeople from Rennes
Recipients of the Ordre national du Mérite
Paralympic table tennis players of France
Table tennis players at the 1992 Summer Paralympics
Table tennis players at the 1996 Summer Paralympics
Table tennis players at the 2000 Summer Paralympics
Table tennis players at the 2004 Summer Paralympics
Medalists at the 1992 Summer Paralympics
Medalists at the 1996 Summer Paralympics
Medalists at the 2000 Summer Paralympics
French female table tennis players
Paralympic medalists in table tennis
Paralympic gold medalists for France
Paralympic silver medalists for France
Paralympic bronze medalists for France
20th-century French women
21st-century French women